Raggamuffin Music Festival  (Raggamuffin) was an annual music festival that toured Australia and New Zealand which concluded its first tour in 2008. As of 2010, it has featured fourteen Major international reggae Acts and thirteen Australasian Acts accommodating reggae, funk, dub, hip-hop and soul.

Line Ups

2008

2009

2010

2011

2012

Compilation albums
 Raggamuffin Vol 1 (2008)
 Raggamuffin Vol 2 (2008)
 Raggamuffin Vol 3 (Album)|Raggamuffin Vol 3 (2010)

See also

List of reggae festivals
Reggae

References

External links
 Official Raggamuffin Australia website
 Official Raggamuffin Australia Facebook
 Official Raggamuffin New Zealand MySpace
 Official New Zealand website

Music festivals in New Zealand
Reggae festivals
Music festivals in Melbourne